Kim Sei-young (born 21 January 1993), also known as Sei Young Kim, is a South Korean professional golfer.

Kim plays on the LPGA of Korea Tour and the LPGA Tour. She has won five times on the LPGA of Korea Tour and twelve times on the LPGA Tour. Her win at the 2018 Thornberry Creek LPGA Classic set the record for the lowest 72-hole score (257) and the lowest to-par score (−31).

Kim won her first major, the 2020 Women's PGA Championship, by five strokes. She was also named the 2020 LPGA Player of the Year.

Professional wins (17)

LPGA Tour wins (12)

LPGA Tour playoff record (4–1)

LPGA of Korea Tour wins (5)

Major championships

Wins (1)

Results timeline
Results not in chronological order before 2019 or in 2020.

CUT = missed the half-way cut
NT = no tournament
T = tied

Summary

 Most consecutive cuts made – 16 (2019 U.S. Open – 2022 Evian, current)
 Longest streak of top-10s – 2 (four times, current)

LPGA Tour career summary

^ Official as of 2022 season

World rank
Position in Women's World Golf Rankings at the end of each calendar year.

Team appearances
Professional
The Queens (representing Korea): 2015
International Crown (representing South Korea): 2016

References

External links

South Korean female golfers
LPGA of Korea Tour golfers
LPGA Tour golfers
Winners of LPGA major golf championships
Olympic golfers of South Korea
Golfers at the 2016 Summer Olympics
Golfers at the 2020 Summer Olympics
Korea University alumni
Golfers from Seoul
1993 births
Living people
20th-century South Korean women
21st-century South Korean women